Asilomar can refer to a number of things:

 Asilomar State Beach, a state park unit on the Monterey Peninsula in California
 Asilomar Conference Grounds, a conference center at "Asilomar State Beach and Conference Grounds"
 Asilomar Conference on Recombinant DNA, an influential conference on the regulation of biotechnology held at the Asilomar Conference Grounds in 1975
 Asilomar International Conference on Climate Intervention Technologies, a conference on the regulation of climate engineering held at the Asilomar Conference Grounds in March 2010
 Asilomar Conference on Beneficial AI, held at the Asilomar Conference Grounds in January 2017